Bucentaure was an 86-gun ship of the line of the French Navy, and the lead ship of her class. She was the flagship of Vice-Admiral Latouche Tréville, who died on board on 18 August 1804.

Bucentaure was named after the mighty Venetian ship Bucentaur which was destroyed by Napoleon I after the fall of the Republic of Venice in 1797. Vice-Admiral Villeneuve hoisted his flag on 6 November 1804. Bucentaure hosted the Franco-Spanish war council while sheltered from the British fleet at Cadiz. The vote was to remain in safe waters (a decision later overruled by Admiral Villeneuve) During the council, Spanish general Antonio de Escaño complained that the atmospheric pressure was descending (a sign of approaching storms). French vice-admiral Charles René Magon de Médine famously retorted "the thing descending here is braveness". This offended Admiral Federico Gravina and other Spanish officers, who did not oppose later the imprudent order of taking to sea.

At the Battle of Trafalgar, on 21 October 1805, she was commanded by Captain Jean-Jacques Magendie. Victory raked her less-protected stern and the vessel lost 197 men and 85 were wounded (including Captain Magendie); the surgeon on board was Dr. Textoris, the squadron's Chief Medical Officer. Admiral Villeneuve was lucky to survive, but this effectively put Bucentaure out of most of the fight.

Villeneuve is supposed to have asked to whom he was surrendering. On being told it was Captain Pellew, he replied, "There is no shame in surrendering to the gallant Sir Edward Pellew." When he was informed that the Conquerors captain (Israel Pellew) was Sir Edward's brother, he said, "England is fortunate to have two such brothers."

In the following days, Bucentaures crew rose up against the prize crew and recaptured the ship. However, she was wrecked in the gale-force storm of 23 October 1805.

References

Bibliography

 

Ships of the line of the French Navy
Ships built in France
Shipwrecks in the Atlantic Ocean
Bucentaure-class ships of the line
1803 ships
Maritime incidents in 1805
Captured ships
Napoleonic-era ships